Greup is a hamlet on a dike in the Dutch province of South Holland. The village lies in the municipality of Hoeksche Waard.

Greup is not a statistical entity, and considered part of Mijnsheerenland. It had place name signs, but they disappeared in 2019. In 1922, a church was built.

References

Populated places in South Holland
Hoeksche Waard